James Robertson Graeme Wright  (born 14 June 1939) is a former Vice-Chancellor of Newcastle University.

Career
Educated at Inverness Royal Academy, the High School of Dundee and the University of Edinburgh, Wright became a lecturer at the University of Edinburgh in 1966. He went on to be a Fellow at St Catharine's College, Cambridge in 1978, Secretary-General of Faculties at the University of Cambridge in 1987 and Vice-Chancellor of Newcastle University in 1991.

After retiring from Newcastle University in 2000 he became Chairman of Age Concern.

References

Living people
1939 births
Commanders of the Order of the British Empire
Deputy Lieutenants of Tyne and Wear
People educated at Inverness Royal Academy
People educated at the High School of Dundee
Alumni of the University of Edinburgh
Vice-Chancellors of Newcastle University